The 2016–17 Edmonton Oilers season was the 38th season for the National Hockey League (NHL) franchise that was established on June 22, 1979, and 45th season including their play in the World Hockey Association (WHA).  This was the Oilers' first season of play at their new downtown arena, Rogers Place. This season also marked the end of their 11-year playoff drought after they clinched the playoffs on March 28 against the Los Angeles Kings for their first playoff appearance since 2006. This season marked the first time since the 1986-87 season that the Oilers recorded 100 points in a season.

Regular season
The Oilers were better than the last several seasons and were compared with the 1980s dynasty. They started with a 7-2-0 record in October.

Standings

Schedule and results

Pre-season

Regular season

Playoffs

Player statistics
As of May 10, 2017

Skaters

Goaltenders

†Denotes player spent time with another team before joining the Oilers. Stats reflect time with the Oilers only.
‡Traded mid-season. Stats reflect time with the Oilers only.
Bold/italics denotes franchise record

Awards and records

NHL Awards
none

Records
42: An Oilers record for most wins by a goaltender in a single season by Cam Talbot
41: Talbot passed the 29-year-old Oilers record of 40 wins by a goaltender (Grant Fuhr) in a single season on April 6, 2017
73: Talbot tied the 29-year-old Oilers record of 73 games started by a goaltender (Fuhr) in a single season

Note: both of these Edmonton Oilers goaltender records still stand as of the end of the 2021–22 Edmonton Oilers season

Milestones

Transactions
Following the end of the Oilers' 2015–16 season, and during the 2016–17 season, this team has been involved in the following transactions:

Trades

Free agents acquired

Free agents lost

Player signings

Draft picks

Below are the Edmonton Oilers' selections at the 2016 NHL Entry Draft, to be held on June 24–25, 2016, at the First Niagara Center in Buffalo.

Notes
  The Florida Panthers' third-round pick went to the Edmonton Oilers as the result of a trade on February 27, 2016, that sent Teddy Purcell to Florida in exchange for this pick (being conditional at the time of the trade). The condition – Edmonton will receive the lower of Minnesota or Florida's third-round pick in 2016 – was converted on April 24, 2016, when Minnesota was eliminated from the 2016 Stanley Cup playoffs ensuring that the Florida's pick would be lower than Minnesota's.
  The Pittsburgh Penguins' third-round pick went to the Edmonton Oilers as the result of a trade on February 27, 2016, that sent Justin Schultz to Pittsburgh in exchange for this pick.
 The Edmonton Oilers' fourth-round pick went to the Anaheim Ducks as the result of a trade on February 29, 2016, that sent Patrick Maroon to Edmonton in exchange for Martin Gernat and this pick.
  The St. Louis Blues' fifth-round pick went to the Edmonton Oilers as the result of a trade on February 27, 2016, that sent Anders Nilsson to St. Louis in exchange for Niklas Lundstrom and this pick.

References

Edmonton Oilers seasons
Edmonton Oilers
Edmont